The North-West Frontier Province Local Government Ordinance, 2001, or the Khyber Pakhtunkhwa Local Government Ordinance, 2001 was an ordinance passed by the Provincial Assembly of North-West Frontier Province (now known as Khyber Pakhtunkhwa) on August 14th, 2001, as part of a series of local government ordinances prepared by the National Reconstruction Bureau passed together by each of the four provinces at the time.

The ordinance was repealed by the Khyber Pakhtunkhwa Local Government Act, 2012.

References

2001 in Pakistani law
Local Government Ordinance, 2001
Government of Khyber Pakhtunkhwa
Local government legislation
Repealed Pakistani legislation